The Portrait of a Lady is a novel by Henry James.

The Portrait of a Lady may also refer to:

Film and television
 The Portrait of a Lady (TV series), a 1968 British television series
 Fascination: Portrait of a Lady, a 1977 Japanese pornographic film
 The Portrait of a Lady (film), a 1996 film adaptation of James's novel by Jane Campion
 Portrait of a Lady on Fire, a 2019 French historical romantic drama film by Celine Sciamma

Fine arts
 Portrait of a Lady (van der Weyden), a c. 1460 painting by Rogier van der Weyden
 Portrait of a Lady Known as Smeralda Brandini, a c. 1475 painting by Sandro Botticelli
 Portrait of a Lady (Titian), several works by Titian
 a 1515 painting by Bernardino Luini
 a 16th century painting by Pier Francesco Foschi
 an 18th century painting by Maria Verelst
 a 1912 painting by Giovanni Boldini
 Portrait of a Lady (Klimt), a 1916–17 painting by Gustav Klimt

Literature
 "Portrait of a Lady" (poem), a 1915 poem by T. S. Eliot
 Portrait of a Lady (novel), a 1936 historical novel by the British writer Eleanor Smith
 "The Portrait of a Lady", a short story by Khushwant Singh

Other uses 
 Portrait of a Lady, a perfume by Dominique Ropion from Editions de Parfums Frédéric Malle

See also
Portrait of a Woman (disambiguation)